Ruxandra Dragomir was the defending champion but lost in the first round to Julie Halard-Decugis.

Halard-Decugis won in the final 6–3, 6–4 against Miriam Oremans.

Seeds
A champion seed is indicated in bold text while text in italics indicates the round in which that seed was eliminated. The top two seeds received a bye to the second round.

  Amanda Coetzer (second round)
  Sandrine Testud (semifinals)
  Dominique Van Roost (first round)
  Sabine Appelmans (quarterfinals)
  Ruxandra Dragomir (first round)
  Amélie Mauresmo (first round)
  Corina Morariu (second round)
  Gala León García (quarterfinals)

Draw

Final

Section 1

Section 2

References

External links
 Official results archive (ITF)
 Official results archive (WTA)

Women's Singles
Singles